Cairuçu Environmental Protection Area is a protected area in the south of Rio de Janeiro state, Brazil.
It contains an important remnant of the Atlantic Forest biome.

Location

Cairuçu Environmental Protection Area lies in the Paraty municipality in the south of Rio de Janeiro state.
It includes the villages of Guarani Araponga and Paraty-Mirim, the Quilombo do Campinho, the Juatinga Ecological Reserve and the Paraty Bay, Paraty-Mirim and Saco do Mamanguá Municipal Environmental Protection Area.
It adjoins and in some areas overlaps the Serra da Bocaina National Park.
It contains the Paraty-Mirim State Park, created in 1972.
It is part of the  Bocaina Mosaic, created in 2006.

Purpose

The environmental protection area was established on 27 December 1985 and is administered by the Chico Mendes Institute for Biodiversity Conservation.
It is classed as IUCN protected area category V: protected landscape/seascape.
The purpose is to preserve nature, scenic landscapes, fauna, flora and water systems as well as the traditional communities of caiçaras, quilombolas and indigenous people.
It tries to reconcile human activities with preservation of wildlife and other natural resources.

Environment

The region includes an important remnant of the Atlantic Forest biome including the various transitions from coastal mangroves to humid tropical forest on the hillsides.
Protected species include southern muriqui (Brachyteles arachnoides), buffy-tufted marmoset (Callithrix aurita), oncilla (Leopardus tigrinus), green sea turtle (Chelonia mydas), sea ginger coral (Millepora alcicornis), catfish (Trichogenes longipinnis), black-capped piprites (Piprites pileata), white-necked hawk (Leucopternis lacernulatus), brown-backed parrotlet (Touit melanonotus) and Chaco eagle (Harpyhaliaetus coronatus).

Notes

Sources

Environmental protection areas of Brazil
Protected areas of Rio de Janeiro (state)
Protected areas of the Atlantic Forest
1985 establishments in Brazil
Protected areas established in 1985